The church of Breckles St Margaret is an Anglican church near Stow Bedon, Norfolk, England. It is one of 124 existent round-tower churches in Norfolk. The church is an active parish church in the Diocese of Norwich. It has been designated a Grade I listed building by English Heritage.

References

External links

St Margaret's on the European Round Tower Churches Website
Images of St Margaret, Breckles

Church of England church buildings in Norfolk
Grade I listed churches in Norfolk
Breckland District
Round towers